Edness K. Wilkins State Park is a public recreation area on the North Platte River located  east of the city of Casper in Natrona County, Wyoming. The state park occupies the site of a former rock quarry that was purchased by the state in 1981 for $380,000. It was named after area resident Edness Kimball Wilkins (1896-1980), who served for 25 years in the Wyoming state legislature. The park encompasses  and offers picnicking, boating, fishing, swimming, and bird watching. The Audubon Society has designated the park an Important Bird Area for its extensive use during the spring and fall migrations and large numbers of common nesting birds. It is managed by the Wyoming Division of State Parks and Historic Sites.

References

External links
Edness K. Wilkins State Park Wyoming State Parks, Historic Sites & Trails
Edness K. Wilkins State Park Brochure & Map Wyoming State Parks, Historic Sites & Trails

State parks of Wyoming
Protected areas of Natrona County, Wyoming
Protected areas established in 1981
1981 establishments in Wyoming
IUCN Category III